Cedric Harris (born 28 February 1967 in Saint George, Dominica) is a retired middle-distance runner from Dominica who competed at the 1996 Summer Olympic Games in the men's 800 metres and finished 6th in his heat, failing to advance. He is currently the former President of the Dominica Amateur Athletic Association.

References

Living people
1967 births
People from Saint George Parish, Dominica
Dominica male middle-distance runners
Commonwealth Games competitors for Dominica
Olympic athletes of Dominica
Athletes (track and field) at the 1994 Commonwealth Games
Athletes (track and field) at the 1996 Summer Olympics